Hymenoxys texana is a rare species of flowering plant in the aster family known by the common names prairie dawn, Texas prairie dawn-flower, and Texas bitterweed. It is endemic to Texas, where it is known only from the general vicinity of Houston. It is threatened by the loss of its habitat. It is a federally listed endangered species of the United States.

Hymenoxys texana is an annual herb with delicate reddish or purplish stems growing only 10 or 15 centimeters (4-6 inches) tall. The leaves have rubbery, glandular blades which may be simple or divided into lobes, particularly at mid-stem. The inflorescence is a solitary flower head or an open cluster of several heads. Each head is under a centimeter wide and has 6 to 8 yellow ray florets each 2 or 3 millimeters long. The ray florets are often tucked behind the phyllaries. The center of the head has 30–75 tiny disc florets.

Hymenoxys texana grows only in the grasslands of the Gulf Coastal Plain in Texas. It can be found on open, barren stretches of saline sandy soil at the base of Mima mounds. The soil is often coated with a slick of algae (Nostoc sp.) during the wet season. The soil dries, cracks, and becomes powdery in the dry season. Few other plants occur on this substrate, but prairie dogshade (Limnosciadium pumilum) can sometimes be associated.

Hymenoxys texana is known only from Harris and Fort Bend Counties in Texas. It was first described in 1891 from a specimen taken near Hockley. Few specimens were noted after this and by 1979 the species was thought to be extinct. Just two years later it was relocated. Today there are about 50 known populations, but most all of these are endangered by the destruction and degradation of their habitat. Most of the occurrences of the plant are within or near the Houston metropolitan area, which is undergoing rapid growth. Habitat is being claimed for residential and other development.

References

External links
USDA Plants Profile for Hymenoxys texana

texana
Endemic flora of Texas
Plants described in 1891
Taxa named by John Merle Coulter
Endangered flora of the United States